Beautiful Journey is a Korean language EP by South Korean band F.T. Island, released on August 25, 2010. The album contains 5 songs, a music video was shot for the title song "Love, Love, Love".

Track list

References

2010 EPs
Pop rock albums by South Korean artists
FNC Entertainment EPs
Genie Music EPs
F.T. Island EPs
Korean-language albums